Polyvalente Roland-Pépin is a Francophone high school in Campbellton, New Brunswick, Canada.

External links
 Roland Pepin School Site

High schools in New Brunswick
Education in Campbellton, New Brunswick